Khustil is a rural locality (a selo) in Dyubeksky Selsoviet, Tabasaransky District, Republic of Dagestan, Russia. The population was 594 as of 2010. There are 3 streets.

Geography 
Khustil is located 18 km north of Khuchni (the district's administrative centre) by road. Gurkhun is the nearest rural locality.

References 

Rural localities in Tabasaransky District